Columbus Vance (February 25, 1902 – December, 1982) was an American Negro league pitcher between 1927 and 1934.

A native of Paynesville, West Virginia, Vance made his Negro leagues debut with the Birmingham Black Barons in 1927. He went on to play for the Homestead Grays and Indianapolis ABCs before finishing his career back in Birmingham in 1934. Vance died in Elkhart, Indiana in 1982 at age 80.

References

External links
 and Seamheads

1902 births
1982 deaths
Date of death missing
Birmingham Black Barons players
Homestead Grays players
Indianapolis ABCs (1931–1933) players
20th-century African-American sportspeople
Baseball pitchers